Carphina arcifera is a species of longhorn beetles of the subfamily Lamiinae. It was described by Henry Walter Bates in 1872, and is known from eastern Mexico to Panama.

References

Beetles described in 1872
Carphina